Starobedeyevo (İśke Bäźäy) is a rural locality (a village) and the administrative centre of Starobedeyevsky Selsoviet, Nurimanovsky District, Bashkortostan, Russia. The population was 493 as of 2010. There are 5 streets.

Geography 
Starobedeyevo is located 86 km west of Krasnaya Gorka (the district's administrative centre) by road. Ustyugovsky is the nearest rural locality.

References 

Rural localities in Nurimanovsky District